Reclus is a mountain subgroup or massif, in Argentina. It is located at La Rioja Province, Vinchina department, at the Puna de Atacama. Reclus is completely within Argentine territory. This peak was named after the French geographer Jacques Élisée Reclus.

First ascent 

The first ascents were made by native Andean people, who built structures upon the summit. The first summit by Europeans was Johan Reinhard (USA) and Louis Glausser (Switzerland) in 03/02/1986.

Elevation 

Based on the elevation provided by the available Digital elevation models, SRTM (6274m), ASTER (6251m), SRTM filled with ASTER (6274m), ALOS (6251m), TanDEM-X(6318m), and also a handheld GPS survey by Maximo Kausch on 10/2012 (6285 metres), Reclus is about 6300 metres above sea level.

Reclus is listed as mountain subgroup or massif, based on the Dominance system  and its dominance is 12.67%. Its parent peak is Bonete Chico and the Topographic isolation is 20.7 km. This information was obtained during a research by Suzanne Imber in 2014.

References

External links 

Elevation information about Reclus
Weather Forecast at Reclus

Six-thousanders of the Andes